Psi-missing may refer to:
Psi hit, the parapsychological experimentation term
Psi-missing (Mami Kawada song), the Opening Theme for the anime series Toaru Majutsu no Index